Beallmore, also known as the William T. Jr., and June Booher House, is a historic mansion located at Wellsburg, Brooke County, West Virginia. It was built in 1907, and is a 2 /2 story brick dwelling with a hipped roof in the Classical Revival style.  The brick used is a pressed, glazed orange brick.  It features a two-story, tetrastyle portico supported by fluted Corinthian order columns.

It was listed on the National Register of Historic Places in 1986.

References

External links
 

Houses on the National Register of Historic Places in West Virginia
Neoclassical architecture in West Virginia
Houses completed in 1907
Houses in Brooke County, West Virginia
National Register of Historic Places in Brooke County, West Virginia